Colin Toal is an English football administrator, manager, and former player who managed IFK Norrköping in 1996. He began his playing career as a forward for the English club Wimbledon. He became the technical director of Indian Football.

References 

Living people
IFK Norrköping managers
Year of birth missing (living people)
English football managers
English footballers
Association football forwards
Wimbledon F.C. players
English expatriate football managers
Expatriate football managers in Sweden
English expatriate sportspeople in Sweden
Allsvenskan managers